Cartoon Wars may refer to:

 A two-part episode of the American animated sitcom South Park.
"Cartoon Wars Part I"
"Cartoon Wars Part II"
Cartoon Wars (app), an iOS video game